Open Britain is a British pro-European Union campaign group set up in the aftermath of the 2016 European Union referendum.

Background 
Following the referendum, the official remain group in the 2016 EU referendum, Britain Stronger in Europe, changed its name on 25 August 2016 to Open Britain.

Open Britain defines itself as campaigning for the United Kingdom to be open and inclusive, open for business, open to trade and investment, open to talent and hard work, open to Europe and to the world. It is originally campaigned for Britain to remain in the Single Market as part of the outcome of the Brexit negotiations.

In October 2016, Open Britain launched a 'Write to Remain' letter-writing campaign directed at Theresa May asking her to guarantee the right of EU nationals to stay in the UK.

The individuals involved in the campaign group include former Ministers Pat McFadden (Labour) and Norman Lamb (Liberal Democrat). Conservatives Anna Soubry, Nicky Morgan, and Dominic Grieve cut their ties with Open Britain in April 2017 after it began to campaign against the re-election of anti-EU members of parliament, mostly Conservatives.

Open Britain continues to campaign in collaboration with other major pro-European campaign groups such as Britain for Europe and European Movement UK. It launched and promotes People's Vote in April 2018 to campaign for a second referendum.

In October 2019, shortly before the 2019 general election, CEO James McGrory was forced out of People's Vote and Open Britain. Almost all the directors resigned. As the lead organisation behind the People's Vote campaign, this led to a major staff walk out in protest at Roland Rudd's, the Chairperson's, actions.

Stop the Rot 

In 2022 Open Britain began a campaign called 'Stop The Rot' promising "Enough is Enough - Johnson Must Go Join the #StopTheRot Summer of Action".. The campaign to remove Boris Johnson was backed by 'Fairvote UK' and 'Let's Take Back Control Ltd' run by campaigner Kyle Gregory Taylor a former candidate for the Advance Together party in the 2019 general election.

Further reading

References

External links
 

2016 establishments in England
2016 establishments in the United Kingdom
2016 United Kingdom European Union membership referendum
Brexit–related advocacy groups in the United Kingdom
Consequences of the 2016 United Kingdom European Union membership referendum
European Union–related advocacy groups in the United Kingdom
International liberal organizations
Lobbying organisations in the United Kingdom
Organisations based in the City of Westminster
Political advocacy groups in the United Kingdom
Political organisations based in London
Pro-Europeanism in the United Kingdom